This is a list of notable events relating to the environment in 1977. They relate to environmental law, conservation, environmentalism and environmental issues.

Events
The World Network of Biosphere Reserves was started.

September 
The Venpet-Venoil collision occurred in dense fog off the coast of South Africa. The Venoil ploughed into the Venpet, eventually leading to the spilling of approximately 26,600–30,500 tonnes of crude oil.

December 
 The Reserves Act 1977 is passed in New Zealand.

See also

Human impact on the environment
List of environmental issues